Rous, an electoral district of the Legislative Assembly in the Australian state of New South Wales was created in 1904 and abolished in 1913.


Election results

1910

1907

1905 by-election

1904

Notes

References

New South Wales state electoral results by district